Busiswa Gqulu (born 8 November 1988), known mononymously as Busiswa or Busi, is a South African singer-songwriter and poet. Born in Mthatha, Eastern Cape, South Africa, she gained public recognition for her feature on DJ Zinhle's song, "My Name Is", after being discovered by Kalawa Jazmee's CEO Oskido.

After a successful collaboration with DJ Zinhle, she released hits singles  includes; "Ngoku", "Lahla", and was featured on Bhizer's hit, "Gobisiqolo". On 8 December 2017, she released her debut album, Highly Flavoured, preceded by single, "Bazoyenza". Throughout her career, Gqulu has received numerous accolades. In 2014, she was named in the Mail & Guardian 200 Young South Africans.

Early life 
Busiswa Gqulu was born on 8 November 1988 in Mthatha, Eastern Cape. When she was young, her family relocated to Durban due to work by her parents At the age of 15, Gqulu grew passion for writing poems. "I’ve been doing poetry since 2004 when I was in Grade 11", she recalled. She performed her first poetry work at her grandmother's funeral. In 2005, she joined the collective Young Basadzi Women of Poetry. Since then, she performed her poetry at corporate events, poem sessions, talent shows, and festivals. She also hosted her monthly poetry events which are called "1st Word Sessions" at the Bat Centre in Durban.

After high school, Gqulu performed her poems while trying to find a proper job. She was then employed at an art centre to teach school children arts. Gqulu's parents supported her career choice as they had no money to take her to university.

Career

2011–2012: Career beginnings 
While performing at live poetry readings, she met a befriend who introduced her to Sir Bubzin. Sir Bubzin invited her while producing the song "Syaphambana". He then suggested to feature her in performing her poems on the track. Gqulu and Sir Bubzin were later signed to Kalawa Record by the CEO, Oskido, after he heard the song. The song was later released on the first Kalawa Jazmee Dance compilation in 2011. Later that year, Gqulu was called by Oskido to record "My Name Is Busiswa" which was produced by DJ Zintle.

The collaboration resulted in a co-writing credit for Gqulu. After recording the song in 2011, she moved to Johannesburg in signing with Kalawa Jazmee Records.
The song was a hit and It received extensive airplays in South African radio stations since its release. Gqulu got gigs in several countries, including Zimbabwe, Angola, and Namibia. The song earned nominees at the Channel O Africa Music Video Award including Most Gifted Dance Video and Video of the Year. The song scoped another nomination at the South African Music Award for Record of the Year.

2013–2016: Ngoku and Clash of Choirs 
"Ngoku" was released on 11 March 2013 as a non-album single on iTunes. The song was accompanied by a video released on YouTube. "Ngoku" became a dance hit with its catchy chorus. The track got several airplays and was commercially successful. Gqulu promoted the single by performing it on e.tv music show Club808, with Oskido. At the 2014 Channel O Africa Music Video Award, the song won Most Gifted Dance category and she performed the song later in the awards ceremony.

In November 2013, Gqulu released a single, "Lahla" featuring Dj Bucks and Uhuru. The song's video accumulated 1 million+ views on YouTube. Gqulu along with Dj Bucks, performed the song live on SABC1 music show Live Amp. She also performed the song at the 2015 Metro FM Awards.

In September 2016, Gqulu joined the fourth season of Clash of the Choirs, as a Choirmaster with Kelly Khumalo, Anele Mdoda, JR, Bucie, Sifiso Ncwane and IFANI. She was the choirmaster of the KwaZulu-Natal. Her team was eliminated after a battle with team Western Cape led by IFANI.

2017–2019: Highly Flavoured and Summer Life
In August 2017, Gqulu announced that her debut album would be titled Highly Flavoured. Throughout the remainder of 2017, Gqulu was featured on several singles  including Tipcee "Isichathulo" and Dj Maphorisa "Vuvushka" and "Midnight Starring".
"Bazoyenza" was released as the lead single for the album. Gqulu released her debut album Highly Flavoured, which features DJ Maphorisa, Busi N, DJ Athie, Da Fre, DJ Toxic, Nokwazi, Moozlie, Lando and Yasirah. The album was nominated at the South African Music Awards for Best Kwaito Album and for Best Female Artist.

Gqulu officially announced her second studio album release, Summer Life, on her Instagram account; the album was  released on 12 November 2018, independently, under Ngqulu new, own company Busiswa Entertainment. On 31 August, Prince Kaybee released "Banomoya" featuring Busiswa and TNS.

In 2019, Ngqulu received two nomination at the 25th South African Music Awards, in the Best Dance Album category for her critical acclaimed album Summer Life and Best Female Category. Also in 2019, Busiswa featured on Beyoncé's The Lion King: The Gift album, on the track "My Power".

2020-Present: AmaPiano crossover and My Side Of The Story
In 2020, she collaborated with South African Amapiano musician, Gaba Cannal on the single Umhlaba Wonke. In that same year, she released her 3rd studio album titled My Side Of The Story which was built of AmaPiano songs, a departure from her dance and Gqom sounds also crossing over to AmaPiano. The album was supported by two singles, "Sbwl" which featured Kamo Mphela and "Makazi" in which she featured Mr JazziQ.

At the MTV Africa Music Awards, she received a nomination for Best Female act.

Personal life 
Gqulu spent her early years under the care and guidance of her late mother and grandmother who were a great influence in shaping her strong personality.
On 8 November 2017, she revealed that she was pregnant on her Instagram account. On 8 January 2018, Gqulu gave birth to a son, Lakhanya Gqulu.

In March 2021, her own-created documentary-reality show title "Her Majesty: Busiswa" premiered on BET Africa.

Other ventures 
In addition to her music and poetry, Busiswa also works for Art for Humanity (AFH) where she provides workshops for school children, as a means to help develop an appreciation for poetry and the visual arts. Gqulu also works with the Umlazi District Department of Education's Youth Development Office, tutoring learners on public speaking, debating and performance poetry.

Discography 
 Highly Flavoured (2017)
 Summer Life (2018)
 My Side of the Story (2020)

See also 
 List of awards and nominations received by Busiswa
 List of South African musicians
 List of African musicians

References

External links
 

Living people
21st-century South African male singers
1988 births
Amapiano musicians
South African women rappers